The Barre Opera House is an opera house in Barre, Vermont, USA. It was built to replace the Barre City Hall/Opera House which burned down in 1898.

History of the Barre Opera House

Beginnings

The current opera house, designed by George G. Adams, a leading architect of public buildings in New England, was finished on August 23, 1899.

In the decades that followed, the opera house served as a venue for staged plays, speakers, traveling shows, bands, and politicians. People such as Helen Keller, Eugene V. Debs, George M. Cohan,  Emma Goldman, John Philip Sousa and Tom Mix graced its stage. In 1912, two presidential candidates made speeches from the outer balcony: William Howard Taft and Theodore Roosevelt.

1930s, 1940s, and Closing
During the Great Depression and World War II, the opera house served the community primarily as a movie house. As other, competing movie venues were built in and around Barre, the opera house fell out of favor and closed its doors in January 1944, remaining vacant for nearly 40 years.

Re-opening and Renovation (1982-1993)
With significant community support, a dilapidated Barre Opera House re-opened in October 1982. The facility was in an advanced state of disrepair; windows were broken, few seats were left, and the outdated heating system did not function.

For a decade after its reopening, the opera house underwent a series of incremental upgrades which added curtains, stage lights and a working heating system. In 1993, funds were raised for a massive renovation which added an elevator and balcony seating. The modern seating capacity was raised to 649, bringing it to more than half of the original, 1899-era capacity. The renovations, which have totaled nearly 2 million dollars, are ongoing, with another $400,000 of improvements in the works.

The Barre Opera House today
More than 20,000 people attend events at the opera house annually.

Many major artists, such as Jackson Browne, John Hiatt, and Shawn Colvin have performed at the BOH in recent years.  As an example of the breadth of artists who perform in a given year, the 2013-2014 season has included Nitty Gritty Dirt Band, The Robert Cray Band, Mavis Staples, Lunasa, The Capitol Steps, Le Vent du Nord, Colin Quinn and pianist John O'Connor.

The opera house is renowned for its acoustical purity and it is the central venue of the Vermont Symphony Orchestra.

The Opera House was mentioned in a National Geographic feature on towns in America.: "The proudly blue-collar city supports the arts; rust-peppered pickup trucks jostled newer cars in the overflowing parking lot of the 1899 Barre Opera House for a recent performance of Carmen. But crowds also packed the place for the Miss Vermont pageant last year. You can rent the same stage for your kid's piano recital."

See also
 Barre (city), Vermont

References
Notes

External links
Barre Opera House - official website
Green Mountain Opera Festival official website

Opera houses in Vermont
Theatres completed in 1899
Music venues completed in 1899
1899 establishments in Vermont